Felsted railway station was located in Essex between Felsted and Little Dunmow. The station closed to regular passenger traffic in 1952. The station building still exists as a private house.

References

Further reading

External links
 Felsted station on navigable 1946 O. S. map
 

Disused railway stations in Essex
Former Great Eastern Railway stations
Railway stations in Great Britain opened in 1869
Railway stations in Great Britain closed in 1964
1869 establishments in England